Microthauma glycinella is a moth in the Lyonetiidae family. It is known from Japan (Kyushu and Okinawa).

The wingspan is 5.5–6 mm. Adults are on wing from the end of July, from the end of August to the beginning of September and from the beginning to the end of October. There are three generations per year.

The larvae feed on Glycine max and Pueraria lobata. They mine the leaves of their host plant. The mine has the form of a linear-blotch mine. The mine starts linear from near the apex of the leaf and extends to the other leaf margin across the midrib in an arched line, then running across the leaf the other way. This linear mine is abruptly broadened near the leaf margin and usually extends on the apical part from the linear mine in an irregular blotch mine. The larvae may move from one leaf to another. The frass is greenish-black and scattered within the mine.

External links
Revisional Studies On The Family Lyonetiidae Of Japan (Lepidoptera)
Japanese Moths

Lyonetiidae
Moths of Japan